The  is Japanese aerial lift line in Kan'onji, Kagawa, operated by Shikoku Cable. Opened in 1987, the line climbs to Unpen-ji, the 66th temple of Shikoku Pilgrimage. The temple is at the highest altitude point of the entire pilgrimage. At the summit, Shikoku Cable also operates Snow Park Unpenji, a ski resort, as well as Wind Park Unpenji, a paragliding field.

Basic data
System: Aerial tramway, 2 track cables and 2 haulage ropes
Distance: 
Span: , the longest in Japan
Vertical interval: 
Operational speed: 10 m/s, the fastest in Japan
Passenger capacity per a cabin: 101
Stations: 2
Time required for single ride: 7 minutes

See also
List of aerial lifts in Japan

External links
 Shikoku Cable official website

Aerial tramways in Japan
1987 establishments in Japan